

Nemapogon is a genus of the fungus moth family, Tineidae. Therein, it belongs to the subfamily Nemapogoninae. As evident by its name, it is the type genus of its subfamily.

Species
As of 2007, 69 species of Nemapogon had been described. New ones are still being discovered on a regular basis:

 Nemapogon acapnopennella (Clemens, 1863) (= N. minutipulnella, N. minutipulvella)
 Nemapogon agenjoi Petersen, 1959 (= N. hispanellus)
 Nemapogon agnathosella Gaedike, 2000
 Nemapogon algerica Gaedike, 2009
 Nemapogon alticolella Zagulajev, 1961
 Nemapogon anatolica Gaedike, 1986
 Nemapogon angulifasciella (Dietz, 1905)
 Nemapogon arcosuensis Gaedike, 2007
 Nemapogon arenbergeri Gaedike, 1986
 Nemapogon asyntacta (Meyrick, 1917)
 Nemapogon auropulvella (Chambers, 1873) (= N. auripulvella)
 Nemapogon bachmarensis Zagulajev, 1964
 Nemapogon barikotellus Petersen, 1973
 Nemapogon bidentata Xiao & Li, 2010
 Nemapogon brandti Gaedike, 1986
 Nemapogon caucasicus (Zagulajev, 1964)
 Nemapogon clematella (Fabricius, 1781) (= Alucita niveella, N. arcellus, N. auritinctella, N. clematea N. clematellus, N. punctella, N. repandella)
 Nemapogon cloacella – cork moth
 Nemapogon cyprica Gaedike, 1986
 Nemapogon defectella (Zeller, 1873)
 Nemapogon defrisiensis (Zagulajev, 1964)
 Nemapogon diarthrota (Meyrick, 1936)
 Nemapogon echinata Gaedike, 2000
 Nemapogon flabellata Xiao & Li, 2010
 Nemapogon flavifrons Petersen, 1959 (= N. kabulianus)
 Nemapogon fungivorella (Benander, 1939) (= N. fungivorellus)
 Nemapogon fuscalbella (Chrétien, 1908)
 Nemapogon geniculatella (Dietz, 1905)
 Nemapogon gerasimovi Zagulajev, 1961
 Nemapogon gliriella (Heyden, 1865) (= N. cachetiellus, N. ibericus )
 Nemapogon granella – European grain moth
 Nemapogon gravosaellus Petersen, 1957 (= N. borshomi, N. gravosaella)
 Nemapogon grossi Gaedike, 2007
 Nemapogon hispanica Petersen & Gaedike, 1992
 Nemapogon hungaricus Gozmány, 1960 (= N. pliginskii)
 Nemapogon inconditella (Lucas, 1956) (= N. buckwelli, N. heydeni, N. thomasi)
 Nemapogon interstitiella (Dietz, 1905)
 Nemapogon kashmirensis Robinson, 1980
 Nemapogon kasyi Gaedike, 1986
 Nemapogon koenigi Capuse, 1967 (= N. wolffiella)
 Nemapogon lagodechiellus Zagulajev, 1962
 Nemapogon leechi Robinson, 1980
 Nemapogon levantinus Petersen, 1961
 Nemapogon mesoplaca (Meyrick, 1919)
 Nemapogon meridionella (Zagulajev 1962) (= N. meridionalis)
 Nemapogon molybdanella (Dietz, 1905)
 Nemapogon multistriatella (Dietz, 1905)
 Nemapogon nevadella (Caradja, 1920)
 Nemapogon nevellus Zagulajev, 1963			
 Nemapogon nigralbella (Zeller, 1859) (= N. nigralbellus)
 Nemapogon ningshanensis Xiao & Li, 2010
 Nemapogon ophrionella (Dietz, 1905)
 Nemapogon orientalis Petersen, 1961 (= N. falstriella)
 Nemapogon oregonella (Busck, 1900)
 Nemapogon palmella (Chretien 1908) (= N. oueddarella)
 Nemapogon picarella (Clerck, 1759) (= N. acerella, N. picarellus, N. rigaella)
 Nemapogon quercicolella
 Nemapogon reisseri Petersen & Gaedike, 1983
 Nemapogon rileyi (Dietz, 1905) (= N. atriflua)
 Nemapogon roburella (Dietz, 1905)
 Nemapogon robusta Gaedike, 2000		
 Nemapogon ruricolella (Stainton, 1859) (= N. cochylidella)
 Nemapogon sardicus Gaedike, 1983
 Nemapogon scholzi Sutter, 2000		
 Nemapogon scutifera Gaedike, 2007	
 Nemapogon signatellus Petersen, 1957
 Nemapogon similella Gaedike, 2007	
 Nemapogon somchetiella Zagulajev, 1961		
 Nemapogon teberdellus (Zagulajev 1963) (= N. georgiellus)
 Nemapogon tylodes (Meyrick, 1919)
 Nemapogon variatella (Clemens, 1859) (= N. apicisignatella )
 Nemapogon vartianae Gaedike, 1986

Synonyms
Junior synonyms of Nemapogon are:
 Anemapogon Zaguljaev, 1963
 "Brosis" Hübner, 1806 (suppressed name)
 Brosis Hübner, 1822 (non Billberg, 1820: preoccupied)
 Diaphthirusa Hübner, [1825]
 Longiductus Zaguljaev, 1964
 Nematopogon Agassiz, 1847 (unjustified emendation; non Zeller, 1839: preoccupied)
 Paranemapogon Zaguljaev, 1964
 Petalographis Zaguljaev, 1962

The genus name Brosis was first proposed by J. Hübner in 1806, but in a book – the famous Tentamen determinsationis ("Preliminary examination") – that was essentially an immense discussion paper and not a valid work of zoological nomenclature. When Hübner came to validly erect the genus in his 1822 genus list (Systematisch-alphabetisches Verzeichnis), it had already been used by G.J. Billberg for what is nowadays considered the Incurvariidae genus Incurvaria.

Gallery

Footnotes

References

  (2008): Australian Faunal Directory – Nemapogon. Version of 2008-OCT-09. Retrieved 2010-MAY-06.
  (2009): Nemapogon. Version 2.1, 2009-DEC-22. Retrieved 2010-MAY-06.
  (2004a): Butterflies and Moths of the World, Generic Names and their Type-species – "Brosis" Hübner, 1804. Version of 2004-NOV-05. Retrieved 2010-MAY-06.
  (2004b): Butterflies and Moths of the World, Generic Names and their Type-species – Brosis Hübner, 1822. Version of 2004-NOV-05. Retrieved 2010-MAY-06.
  (2004c): Butterflies and Moths of the World, Generic Names and their Type-species – Nemapogon. Version of 2004-NOV-05. Retrieved 2010-MAY-06.
  [2010]: Global Taxonomic Database of Tineidae (Lepidoptera). Retrieved 2010-MAY-06.
  (2005): Markku Savela's Lepidoptera and some other life forms – Nemapogon. Version of 2003-DEC-27. Retrieved 2010-MAY-06.

Nemapogoninae